Cory Taylor (1955 – 5 July 2016) was an Australian writer.

Taylor was born in Southport, Queensland and lived in Fiji and Kenya as a child. She studied history at the Australian National University, and then worked as a freelance film and television writer, with her work including the 1988 two-part television film Alterations for the ABC. Her first books were the Rat Tales and Bandaged Bear series of children's books.

Diagnosed with melanoma in 2005, Taylor turned to writing fiction and her 2011 début novel, Me and Mr Booker, won the Commonwealth Book Prize for the Pacific Region in 2012. Her next book, My Beautiful Enemy (2013), was shortlisted for the Miles Franklin Award.

As her health worsened, Taylor wrote her last book Dying: A Memoir, which was published just before her death from melanoma-related brain cancer on 5 July 2016. It was shortlisted for the 2017 Stella Prize and included in Barack Obama's list of best books in 2017.

Bibliography

 Rat Tales, illustrated by Stephen Michael King, Scholastic Australia, Sydney, 1999, Vol. 1, Rat's Lucky Day and Rat Goes Fishing, ; Vol. 2, Rat and the Rude Cap and Rat and the Big Stink 
 Bandaged Bear and the Broken Bones, co-authored with Peter Townsend, Scholastic Australia, Sydney, 2001, 
 Bandaged Bear Saves His Breath, co-authored with Peter Townsend, Scholastic Australia, Sydney, 2001, 
 Bandaged Bear and the Birthday Party, co-authored with Peter Townsend, Scholastic Australia, Sydney, 2002, 
 Me and Mr Booker, Text Publishing, Melbourne, 2010, 
 German: Mr. Booker und ich, List/Ullstein Verlag, Berlin, 2019, 
 
 My Beautiful Enemy, Text Publishing, Melbourne, 2013, 
 Dying: A Memoir, Text Publishing, Melbourne, 2016,

References

External links

1955 births
2016 deaths
20th-century Australian women writers
20th-century Australian writers
21st-century Australian novelists
21st-century Australian women writers
Australian children's writers
Australian National University alumni
Australian television writers
Australian women children's writers
Australian women novelists
Australian women screenwriters
Deaths from brain tumor
Deaths from cancer in Queensland
Deaths from melanoma
Griffith Review people
Australian women television writers
Writers from Queensland